Major General Robert Wanless O'Gowan  (5 September 1864 – 15 December 1947) was a British Army officer who commanded the 31st Division during the First World War.

Early career
Wanless O'Gowan joined the Army as a lieutenant in The Cameronians (Scottish Rifles) on 28 April 1886, having transferred from the Militia. He was promoted to captain on 19 February 1896, and served on regimental duties until the Second Boer War. He was sent to South Africa in 1899, and was severely wounded at the Battle of Spion Kop; he later served as a railway staff officer in 1900 and 1901 before returning home with the brevet rank of major. During the war, he was mentioned in despatches twice. Following his return to the United Kingdom, he was in October 1901 appointed as the Inspector of Musketry in the Southern District, based in Portsmouth. In 1903 he was formally confirmed in the rank of major and made deputy assistant adjutant-general for the North-East District. He returned to regimental duties in 1905.

First World War
In 1914, following the outbreak of the First World War, he took a staff role as assistant quartermaster-general and then assistant adjutant-general with the British Expeditionary Force. Following heavy fighting, he was assigned to 6th Division on 1 October as its assistant adjutant-general and quartermaster-general, succeeding Walter Campbell. He remained with the division until February 1915, handing over his post to Reginald May. O'Gowan was then transferred to a field command, taking over the 13th Brigade in the 5th Division. The brigade was temporarily attached to 28th Division at this time, and involved in defending against a heavy German attack at St. Eloi on 14 March, and the successful attack on Hill 60 in mid-April. In August, he was promoted to temporary major general returned to England to take command of the newly formed 31st Division, a New Army division predominantly drawn from the industrial towns of Northern England, and mainly composed of close-knit "Pals battalions".

O'Gowan would command the division until 1918, during which time it saw brief service in Egypt followed by its first active service at the first day on the Somme, 1 July 1916. At the Somme, the division was assigned to capture Serre on the flank of the main assault and guard against counter-attacks; however, the attacking battalions were decimated by German machine-guns before crossing no-man's land, with only small groups surviving to reach the far trenches. Some small parties reached their objectives, including one group inside Serre itself, but they had no support from reserves and were destroyed. The division lost 3593 officers and men killed, wounded, or missing, with only eight men from the attacking waves surviving to be taken as prisoners of war. Some battalions had a casualty rate of over 80%. The division did not see further heavy fighting, other than routine trench garrisons, until November, when it fought at the Battle of the Ancre. In the spring of 1917 it fought under Wanless-O'Gowan's command with more success at the Battle of Arras.

In March 1918 he returned to England to assume command of the Cannock Chase Reserve Centre, taking over from Richard Hutton Davies, who had been relieved due to severe physical and mental illness. He remained at Cannock Chase until February 1920, when the centre was closed after demobilisation and he retired from the Army.

References

1864 births
1947 deaths
British Army generals of World War I
British Army personnel of the Second Boer War
Companions of the Order of the Bath
Companions of the Order of St Michael and St George
British Army major generals